Per Risvik (born 4 September 1937 in Herøy, Møre og Romsdal) is a Norwegian politician (FrP). He was elected to the Storting from Sør-Trøndelag in 1989.

Storting Committees
1989 – 1993 part of the Transport and Communication committee

External links

1937 births
Living people
Members of the Storting
Progress Party (Norway) politicians
20th-century Norwegian politicians
People from Møre og Romsdal
Sør-Trøndelag politicians